Dunn's least gecko (Sphaerodactylus dunni) is a species of lizard in the family Sphaerodactylidae. The species is endemic to Honduras.

Etymology
The specific name, dunni, is in honor of American herpetologist Emmett Reid Dunn.

Geographic range
S. dunni is found in northern Honduras.

Habitat

Description
The dorsal scales are keeled and imbricate (overlapping).

Behavior
S. dunni is terrestrial and diurnal.

Reproduction
S. dunni is oviparous.

References

Further reading
Harris DM, Kluge AG (1984). "The Sphaerodactylus (Sauria: Gekkonidae) of Middle America". Occasional Papers of the Museum of Zoology, University of Michigan (706): 1-59. (Sphaerodactylus dunni, p. 42).
Köhler G (2008). Reptiles of Central America, Second Edition. Offenbach, Germany: Herpeton Verlag. 400 pp. .
McCranie JR (2018). "The Lizards, Crocodiles, and Turtles of Honduras. Systematics, Distribution, and Conservation". Bulletin of the Museum of Comparative Zoology 15 (1): 1–129.
Meyer JR, Wilson LD (1971). "Taxonomic Studies and Notes on some Honduran Amphibians and Reptiles". Bulletin of the Southern California Academy of Sciences 70: 106–114. 
Schmidt KP (1936). "New Amphibians and Reptiles from Honduras in the Museum of Comparative Zoology". Proceedings of the Biological Society of Washington 49: 43–50. (Sphaerodactylus dunni, new species, pp. 46–47).

Sphaerodactylus
Reptiles of Honduras
Endemic fauna of Honduras
Reptiles described in 1936
Taxa named by Karl Patterson Schmidt